Ganna may refer to:

Ganna (name)
 Ganna (cycling team), an Italian professional cycling team, 1913 - 1953
Ganna (prophet), German prophet and priestess of the 1st century AD
Ganna, Hungary, village in Hungary
Caroxylon aphyllum, also known as Ganna, a shrub
Ganna or Leddat, see Christmas in Ethiopia and Eritrea

See also
 Gaana, a type of Tamil song
 Gaana, an Indian commercial music streaming service